Rob Rothenburger (born December 18, 1958) is an American politician who served in the Kentucky House of Representatives from the 58th district from 2017 to 2020.

References

1958 births
Living people
Republican Party members of the Kentucky House of Representatives